Haley McCormick (born October 7, 1985) is an American film and television actress.

Filmography  
 2010 – Slow Moe
 2005 – Urban Legends: Bloody Mary
 2004 – Halloweentown High
 2002 – Everwood
 2001 – Little Secrets
 2001 – The Poof Point
 2000 – Beyond the Prairie: The True Story of Laura Ingalls Wilder
 1999 – A Dog's Tale
 1998 – No More Baths
 1996 – In the Blink of an Eye

External links  
 

1985 births
Living people
Actresses from Salt Lake City
American child actresses
American television actresses
American film actresses
21st-century American women